The term strewn field indicates the area where meteorites from a single fall are dispersed.
It is also often used for the area containing tektites produced by large meteorite impact.

Formation
There are two strewnfield formation mechanisms:
 Mid-air fragmentation: when a large meteoroid enters the atmosphere it often fragments into many pieces before touching the ground due to thermal shock. This mid-air explosion disperses material over a large oval-shaped area. The long axis of this oval is along the flight path of the meteoroid. When multiple-explosions occur, the material can be found in several overlapping ovals.
 Impact fragmentation: when there is almost no mid-air fragmentation the fragmentation can occur upon impact. In this case the strewnfield shape can be different, usually circular. (e.g. Canyon Diablo at Meteor Crater; Australasian strewnfield)

Fragments distribution
In the case of mid-air fragmentation, smaller fragments tend to fall shorter and the biggest fragments are usually found at the far end of the oval. In order to get an idea of the original flight direction it is necessary to analyze the size pattern of the material over the strewnfield. Fragments of about 1 to 5 grams can be picked up on weather radar as they fall at terminal velocity.

See also
 Glossary of meteoritics

References

 
Strewn field